Əlimədədli or Alimadadli may refer to:
Əlimədədli, Agdam, Azerbaijan
Əlimədədli, Goygol, Azerbaijan